The Biafran Armed Forces (BAF) were the military of the Nigerian secessionist state of Biafra, which existed from 1967 until 1970.

History 

At the beginning of the Nigerian Civil War, Biafra had 3,000 soldiers. This number grew as the war progressed, ultimately reaching 30,000. No official support for the Biafran Army came from any other nation, although arms were clandestinely acquired. Because of this, the Biafrans manufactured many of their weapons locally.

Some Europeans served the Biafran cause: German-born Rolf Steiner was a lieutenant colonel assigned to the 4th Commando Brigade, and Welshman Taffy Williams served as a major throughout the conflict. A special guerrilla unit, the Biafran Organization of Freedom Fighters, was established: designed to emulate the Viet Cong, they targeted Nigerian supply lines, forcing them to shift resources to internal security efforts.

Legacy 
In course of the insurgency in Southeastern Nigeria of 2021, a separatist group known as "Biafran National Guard" (BNG) organized the "Biafran Supreme Military Council of Administration". The latter posed as high command of the restored Biafran Armed Forces, including the "Biafran Army, Biafran Navy, Biafran Air-Force and Biafran Detective Force".

Branches

Army 
At the peak of Biafran military power, the Biafran Army was made of 5 divisions; numbered 11th, 12th, 13th (later renumbered 15th), 14th and 101st. It also had 2 separate brigades, the S Brigade, a Pretorian guard for General Ojukwu, and the 4th Commando Brigade (trained and commanded by mercenaries). It was commanded by Brigadier Hillary Njoku and later Major General Alexander Madiebo.

Air force 

The Biafrans set up a small, yet effective air force. Biafran Air Force commanders were Chude Sokey and later Godwin Ezeilo, who had trained with the Royal Canadian Air Force. Its early inventory included two B-25 Mitchells, two B-26 Invaders, (one piloted by Polish World War II ace Jan Zumbach, known also as John Brown), a converted DC-3 and one Dove. In 1968, Swedish pilot Carl Gustaf von Rosen suggested the MiniCOIN project to General Ojukwu.

By early 1969, Biafra had assembled five MFI-9Bs in Gabon, calling them "Biafra Babies". They were coloured green, were able to carry six 68 mm anti-armour rockets under each wing using simple sights. The five planes were flown by three Swedish pilots and three Biafran pilots. In September 1969, Biafra acquired four ex-Armee de l'Air North American T-6Gs, which were flown to Biafra the following month, with another T-6 lost on the ferry flight. These aircraft flew missions until January 1970 manned by Portuguese ex-military pilots.

During the war, Biafra tried to acquire jets. Two Fouga Magisters and several Gloster Meteors were bought but never arrived in Biafra, being abandoned on foreign African airbases.

Navy 
Biafra had a small improvised navy, but it never gained the success of the air force. It was headquartered in Kidney Island, Port Harcourt, and was commanded by Winifred Anuku. The Biafran Navy was made up of captured craft, converted tugs, and armored civilian vessels armed with machine guns, or captured 6-pounder guns. It mainly operated in the Niger Delta and along the Niger River.

Weapons and equipment used by Army and militias

Ranks

References

Bibliography 
  Daly, Samuel Fury Childs.  A History of the Republic of Biafra: Law, Crime, and the Nigerian Civil War, (Cambridge  University Press, 2020) online review
 
 

 

Disbanded armed forces
Biafra